Stephen Nathan Kinnock (born 1 January 1970) is a Welsh politician who has served as Member of Parliament (MP) for Aberavon since 2015. A member of the Labour Party, he has been Shadow Minister for Immigration since 2022.

Early life and education
Kinnock was born in Tredegar, Monmouthshire, the son of British politicians Glenys Kinnock and Neil Kinnock. He describes himself as from a "Labour and Trade Union family".

Kinnock was educated at Drayton Manor High School, a comprehensive school in Hanwell, London. He studied Modern Languages at Queens' College, Cambridge, graduating with a Bachelor of Arts (BA) degree. He studied for a Master of Arts (MA) degree at the College of Europe in Bruges, graduating in 1993.

Although Kinnock's mother was a Welsh speaker, his father was not; he has suggested that Glenys "was reluctant to use Welsh with me for fear of shutting him out". He began learning the language properly as an adult, making a pledge to do so when he stood as a parliamentary candidate for a Welsh constituency. He is multi-lingual and has stated that "Languages go to right to the root of me", adding "...as a politician I want
to reach out and listen. Languages are a major part of that."

Early career
Kinnock worked as a research assistant at the Brussels European Parliament before becoming a British Council Development and Training Services executive based in Brussels in 1997. He held various positions with the British Council including director of its St. Petersburg office. Following the Russian authorities' closure of this office, Kinnock was posted to the British Council in Sierra Leone.

In January 2009, he joined the World Economic Forum as director, head of Europe and Central Asia, based in Geneva, Switzerland. In August 2012, he took up a position at the business consultancy Xyntéo in London, Kinnock was managing director of the "Global Leadership and Technology Exchange" in 2012.

Refuted tax evasion allegation

In June 2010, the Danish tabloid newspaper B.T. accused Kinnock of tax evasion. At that time, he was paying tax in Switzerland where his workplace was situated, and where he had declared his main residence, although his wife's political website stated that "The family lives in Østerbro in Copenhagen". The couple had previously stated to the media that Kinnock would spend his weekends in Denmark, sometimes including Thursday, and that he regarded his home and base as being exclusively with his family in Copenhagen. According to the newspaper, he would possibly exceed 183 days a year in Denmark, meaning he would be fully taxable there. His wife rebutted the accusations but said the couple would ask the Danish tax authority for an audit. The audit was concluded on 17 September 2010, and concluded that "Mr Kinnock does not have tax liability for 2007, 08, or 09, as he does not reside in this country within the meaning of the Danish Tax at Sources Act".

Political career

In March 2014, Kinnock was selected as the Labour Party candidate for the seat of Aberavon in Wales for the 2015 General Election. On 7 May 2015, he was elected the Member of Parliament for Aberavon with a majority of 10,445.

Kinnock was appointed Parliamentary Private Secretary (PPS) to the shadow Business, Innovation and Skills team in September 2015. He resigned as PPS in June 2016 and supported Owen Smith's failed attempt to replace Jeremy Corbyn in the 2016 Labour Party leadership election. 

During the 2017 general election campaign, Kinnock was one of four MPs critical of Jeremy Corbyn's leadership of the Labour Party who were followed for six weeks for the BBC documentary Labour: The Summer that Changed Everything. The documentary showed Kinnock predicting the poll would "not be a good night" for Labour, and his response to Labour gains in the election. He was re-elected in 2017 with an increased majority of 16,761, and 68.1% of the vote share.

Kinnock held his seat at the 2019 general election with a majority of 10,490 and a vote share of 53.8%. He endorsed Lisa Nandy in the 2020 Labour Party leadership election.

Following Keir Starmer's election as Labour Leader in April 2020, he was appointed as Shadow Asia and Pacific Minister. Kinnock changed role in the December 2021 front bench reshuffle, becoming Shadow Armed Forces Minister, and moved again in February 2022, following Jack Dromey's death, to become Shadow Immigration Minister.

COVID-19 non-compliance allegation

Kinnock posted a photo on Twitter after travelling from Wales to London to visit his father on his birthday on 28 March 2020 – five days after the lockdown came into force. They were social distancing, but South Wales Police responded: "We know celebrating your Dad's birthday is a lovely thing to do; however, this is not essential travel. We all have our part to play in this, we urge you to comply with @GOVUK restrictions, they are in place to keep us all safe. Thank you." Kinnock stated that "this was essential travel as I had to deliver some necessary supplies to my parents".

Personal life
His father, Neil Kinnock, is a former Leader of the Labour Party and was also a European Commissioner and Vice President of the European Commission. His mother, Glenys Kinnock, formerly served as a Labour Party Member of the European Parliament (MEP).

In 1996, Kinnock married Helle Thorning-Schmidt, who later became Prime Minister of Denmark. They met when both attended the College of Europe. The couple have two children, including a child who came out as transgender and non-binary in 2022, aged 22. Their grandfather Neil Kinnock spoke of his pride after his grandchild came out as transgender.

Kinnock is an honorary associate of the National Secular Society.

When his father was created a Life peer in 2005 as Baron Kinnock of Bedwellty, Kinnock was granted the prefix The Honourable as the son of a baron.

Notes

References

External links

 Official website
 

1970 births
Living people
Alumni of Queens' College, Cambridge
British diplomats
British expatriates in Belgium
British expatriates in Denmark
College of Europe alumni
Stephen
People educated at Drayton Manor High School
People from Tredegar
Sons of life peers
Spouses of prime ministers of Denmark
UK MPs 2015–2017
UK MPs 2017–2019
UK MPs 2019–present
Welsh Labour Party MPs
Welsh people of Scottish descent
Welsh socialists
Welsh-speaking politicians